Disco Beaver from Outer Space is an early production by National Lampoon, made for HBO in 1979.

The short film is a collection of comedy sketches, contained within the main story which is centered on two characters: the protagonist, an extraterrestrial in the form of a human sized (and bipedal) beaver; and the antagonist, a gay vampire called "Dragula".
Among the various side gags (which arise as the "viewer" channel-surfs) is a short concert by a stereotyped band of Irish singers called "The Spud Brothers" (potato-shaped puppets).

Tagline: National Lampoon's mockery of everything that is wrong with cable TV.

Plot
The film is essentially a shaggy dog story, leading up to a single play-on-words joke based on "beaver" also being a euphemism for female genitals. At the film's climax, the vampire is frightened by the Beaver; in his delirium, he begins seeing double, thus seeing two images of the Beaver. He cries, "Split beaver!" and disintegrates.

Cast
Lynn Redgrave - Dr. Van Helsing
Rodger Bumpass
Peter Elbling - Dragula, Queen of Darkness		
Alice Playten	
James Widdoes - Construction worker
Lee Wilkof	
Michael Simmons
Sarah Durkee

See also

 List of National Lampoon films

External links
 

American television films
HBO network specials
National Lampoon films
1979 television films
1979 films
1979 comedy films